The 2015 Città di Caltanissetta was a professional tennis tournament played on clay courts. It was the 17th edition of the tournament which was part of the 2015 ATP Challenger Tour. It took place in Caltanissetta, Italy between 8 and 14 June 2015.

Singles main-draw entrants

Seeds

 1 Rankings are as of May 25, 2015.

Other entrants
The following players received wildcards into the singles main draw:
  Salvatore Caruso
  Federico Gaio
  Gianluigi Quinzi
  Stefano Travaglia

The following players received entry from the qualifying draw:
  Nicolás Barrientos
  Quentin Halys
  Gonzalo Lama
  Juan Ignacio Londero

The following players received entry as a lucky loser into the main draw:
  Duilio Beretta

Doubles main-draw entrants

Seeds

1 Rankings as of May 25, 2015.

Other entrants
The following pairs received wildcards into the doubles main draw:
  Gianluigi Quinzi /  Stefano Travaglia
  Alessio di Mauro /  Nicolò Schilirò
  Salvatore Caruso /  Federico Gaio

The following pairs used protected ranking to gain entry into the doubles main draw:
  James Cerretani /  Adam Hubble

Champions

Singles

 Elias Ymer def.  Bjorn Fratangelo 6–3, 6–2

Doubles

 Guido Andreozzi /  Guillermo Durán def.  Lee Hsin-han /  Alessandro Motti 6–3, 6–2

External links
Official Website

Citta di Caltanissetta
Città di Caltanissetta